Roenis Leliebre Elías (born August 1, 1988) is a Cuban left-handed professional baseball pitcher in the Chicago Cubs organization. He made his MLB debut in 2014. He previously played in MLB for the Boston Red Sox, Washington Nationals and Seattle Mariners.

Professional career

Cuban career
Elías pitched two seasons for Guantánamo in the Cuban National Series. In the 2008–09 season, he pitched 31 innings in 18 games (one start), compiling a 2–3 record with a 7.84 earned run average (ERA). In the 2009–10 season, he had a 7.14 ERA with 5–7 record while pitching 63 innings in 21 games (17 starts).

Elías defected from Cuba in 2010, hoping to sign a contract with a Major League Baseball team. He traveled 30 hours by boat from Cuba to Cancun, Mexico. He initially played on the "B" team of the Sultanes de Monterrey in the Mexican League.

Seattle Mariners
Elías signed a minor league contract with the Seattle Mariners on May 3, 2011. He made his minor league debut that season and pitched for the Rookie League Pulaski Mariners and Arizona League Mariners, and the Single-A Clinton LumberKings. Overall, he went 5–2 with a 4.28 ERA and 41 strikeouts over  innings pitched.

In 2012, he played for the Class A-Advanced High Desert Mavericks. He started 26 games, finishing with an 11–6 record, 3.76 ERA, 128 strikeouts over  innings pitched. He played the 2013 season with the Double-A Jackson Generals. He started 22 games, had a 6–11 record and 121 strikeouts over 130 innings.

Invited to spring training by the Mariners in 2014, Elías competed for a rotation spot on the Mariners' Opening Day roster, making the team as one of the starting pitchers. Elías made his Major League debut April 3, 2014. Against the Detroit Tigers on June 1, Elias recorded the team's first shutout by a rookie since Freddy García in 1999. For the 2014 season, Elías pitched in 29 games (all starts) for the Mariners, compiling a 10–12 record with 3.85 ERA in  innings pitched.

During the 2015 season, Elías made 22 appearances (20 starts) for Seattle, pitching  innings with 4.14 ERA while compiling a record of 5–8. He also made 12 starts for the Triple-A Tacoma Rainiers, with a 4–2 record and 7.34 ERA in  innings pitched.

Overall for the Mariners, Elías appeared in 51 MLB games (49 starts) with a 15–20 record with 3.97 ERA in 279 innings pitched.

Boston Red Sox
On December 7, 2015, the Mariners traded Elías and Carson Smith to the Boston Red Sox for Wade Miley and Jonathan Aro.

Elías made his Boston debut in relief on April 23, 2016, against the Houston Astros.  In June, he was called up from the Triple-A Pawtucket Red Sox and faced his former teammates in his first starting appearance with the Red Sox on June 17, giving up seven runs over four innings. Elías was optioned back to Pawtucket after the game. He made one additional appearance for Boston during the season, pitching two innings of one-run relief against the Arizona Diamondbacks on August 16. Overall, for the 2016 season, Elías made three appearances for Boston, pitching  innings with a 12.91 ERA and 0–1 record.

Elías started the 2017 season on the disabled list, due to a muscle strain suffered in early March. After missing several months of the season, he played with four different Red Sox farm teams; the Single-A Lowell Spinners and Salem Red Sox, Double-A Portland Sea Dogs, and Triple-A Pawtucket. For those four teams, he pitched a total of  innings in 10 games with a 6.96 ERA and a 1–6 record. Late in the season, he made a single appearance for Boston, pitching  of an inning on September 4 against the Toronto Blue Jays; he walked one batter and struck out one batter.

Elías started the 2018 season with Triple-A Pawtucket, where he appeared in four games in relief, pitching a total of  innings with a 1.23 ERA, 1–0 record, and one save.

Overall for the Red Sox, Elías appeared in 4 MLB games (one start) with a 0–1 record with 12.38 ERA in 8 innings pitched.

Second stint with Mariners
On April 23, 2018, the Red Sox traded Elías to the Seattle Mariners for a player to be named later (PTNBL) or cash considerations. They agreed on Eric Filia as the PTBNL in June, but Filia failed his physical exam with the Red Sox, and was returned to Seattle, with the Red Sox acquiring cash considerations instead.

After reporting to Triple-A Tacoma, he went 2–4 with a 4.94 ERA (17 ER, 31.0 IP) with 27 strikeouts and 12 walks in 7 games (6 starts). On June 1, 2018, Elías was called up from Tacoma to make his season debut against the Tampa Bay Rays, in which he tossed two scoreless innings in relief, earning the win. Throughout the season, Elías was typically used as a long reliever or spot starter, finishing 2018 with a 2.65 ERA, 154 ERA+, 3.08 FIP, and 2.13 strikeout-to-walk ratio in 23 appearances (51.0 IP), including 4 starts.

Following the departure of All-Star closer Edwin Díaz in the 2018 offseason as well as an early-season injury to newly-acquired closer Hunter Strickland, Elías was used exclusively out of the bullpen especially in high leverage situations, ultimately becoming the team's new closer. In 44 games (47.0 IP) with the Mariners in 2019, he pitched to a 3.64 ERA with 14 saves. 45 strikeouts, and 17 walks.

Washington Nationals
On July 31, 2019, the Mariners traded Elías and Hunter Strickland to the Washington Nationals in exchange for Aaron Fletcher, Taylor Guilbeau, and Elvis Alvarado. Elías made his Nationals debut on August 2, 2019, recording the final two outs of the sixth inning. However, he was forced to leave the game and was placed on the 10-day injured list after he pulled his right hamstring running down the first-base line during an at-bat the following inning. In 2019 he pitched three innings for the Nationals. Between the Mariners and the Nationals combined in 2019, he was 4–2 with 14 saves and a 3.96 ERA, as in 48 relief appearances he pitched 50.0 innings. The Nationals finished the 2019 year with a 93–69 record, clinching the wild card, and eventually won the World Series over the Astros. Elias was not part of the Nationals' postseason run, but still won his first world championship. Elias was outrighted off of the Nationals 40-man roster on October 9, 2020, and elected free agency the next day.

Third stint with Mariners
On January 7, 2021, Elías signed a minor league contract with the Seattle Mariners organization. On March 16, it was announced that Elias had suffered a torn ulnar collateral ligament that required Tommy John surgery and cause him to miss the 2021 season. On March 26, Elías was released by the Mariners. On April 1, Elias re-signed with the Mariners on a new minor league contract. 

On May 16, 2022, Elias was selected to the active roster. He made one relief appearance for the Mariners, allowing one earned run on one hit and two walks against the Toronto Blue Jays. On May 19, Elias was removed from the 40-man roster and returned to Triple-A. On May 27, Elias was selected back to the active roster.

The Mariners designated Elías for assignment on June 20, 2022. On October 17, 2022, Elías elected free agency.

Chicago Cubs
On December 20, 2022, Elías signed a minor league contract with the Chicago Cubs.

See also

List of baseball players who defected from Cuba

References

External links
, or Retrosheet

1988 births
Living people
Águilas Cibaeñas players
Cuban expatriate baseball players in the Dominican Republic
Arizona League Mariners players
Boston Red Sox players
Cardenales de Lara players
Cuban expatriate baseball players in Venezuela
Clinton LumberKings players
Defecting Cuban baseball players
High Desert Mavericks players
Indios de Guantanamo players
Jackson Generals (Southern League) players
Lowell Spinners players
Major League Baseball pitchers
Major League Baseball players from Cuba
Cuban expatriate baseball players in the United States
Pawtucket Red Sox players
Sportspeople from Guantánamo
Portland Sea Dogs players
Pulaski Mariners players
Salem Red Sox players
Seattle Mariners players
Tacoma Rainiers players
Washington Nationals players
2023 World Baseball Classic players